Ashraf Ali Thanwi (often referred as Hakim al-Ummat and Mujaddid e Millet (19 August 1863 – 20 July 1943) was a late-nineteenth and twentieth-century Sunni scholar, jurist, thinker, reformist and the revival of classical sufi thought from Indian subcontinent during the British Raj, one of the chief proponents of Pakistan Movement. He was a central figure of Islamic spiritual, intellectual and religious life in South Asia and continues to be highly influential today. As a prolific author, he completed over a thousand works including Bayan Ul Quran and Bahishti Zewar. He graduated from Darul Uloom Deoband in 1883 and moved to Kanpur, then Thana Bhawan to direct the Khanqah-i-Imdadiyah, where he resided until the end of his life. His training in Quran, Hadith, Fiqh studies and Sufism qualified him to become a leading Sunni authority among the scholars of Deoband. His teaching mixes Sunni orthodoxy, Islamic elements of belief and the patriarchal structure of the society. He offered a sketch of a Muslim community that is collective, patriarchal, hierarchical and compassion-based.

Views and thoughts

Political ideology 
Thanwi was a strong supporter of the Muslim League. He maintained a correspondence with the leadership of All India Muslim League (AIML), including Muhammad Ali Jinnah. He also sent groups of Muslim scholars to give religious advice and reminders to Jinnah. His disciples Zafar Ahmad Usmani and Shabbir Ahmad Usmani were key players in religious support for the creation of Pakistan. During the 1940s, many Deobandi Ulama supported the Congress but Thanwi and some other leading Deobandi scholars including Muhammad Shafi Deobandi and Shabbir Ahmad Usmani were in favour of the Muslim League. Thanwi resigned from Darul Uloom Deoband's management committee due to its pro-Congress stance. His support and the support of his disciples for Pakistan Movement were greatly appreciated by AIML.

Works and contribution 
He led a very active life teaching, preaching, writing, lecturing and making occasional journey. He belonged to a period when Muslims were physically intellectually under attack by the western colonial powers and the Arya Samaj. His literary life began at Darul Uloom Deoband and that he wrote a Mathnawi titled as "Zeero-bam", in Persian language at the age of eighteenth. For fourteenth years he was a teacher in Madrasa Faiz e Aam, in Kanpur, taught, wrote, and gave sermons and issued Fatwa. From the early days of his educational life, he was very much impressed by Rashid Ahmad Gangohi.

Most of his books are in Urdu, Arabic and Persian. There is no branch of Islam in which his book may not be present. It is said that the number of his works is nearly one thousand. The rights of printing of all his books were public. He never earned a single paisa from his books. Millions of individual derived educational and practical benefit from his books and predicatory lectures.

His sermons were written, while they were delivered from city to city and shown to him and published, Muslims benefitted from them. These contained Islamic rules and regulations, stoppage of innovations, facts and figures interesting topics etc. Normally, lectures discussed were about Islamic worship, but he also talked about morals, dealings, practical daily life in his sermons. He kept this in mind in his training of Sulook and Tariqah as well. A list of his major works is given here:
 Bayan Ul Quran: It is a three volume tafsir (exegesis) of the Quran. The compilation of this exegesis was started in 1320 AH. It was published in twelve volumes from Matb'a Mujtabai, Delhi in 1908 (1326 AH).
 Bahishti Zewar: It is comprehensive handbook of fiqh, Islamic rituals and morals, it is especially aimed at the education of girls and women. The volume describes the Five Pillars of Islam and also highlights more obscure principles. For years it has remained a favorite with the people of the Indian subcontinent as well as Indian Muslim diaspora all over the world.
 Imdad al-Fatawa: It is the collection of Thanwis fatwas, which is a compendium of Hanafi Fiqh containing research-oriented fatwas and fiqhi discourses.
 Nashr al-Tib fi Zikr-un-Nabi Al Habib Sallalahu 'alaihi Wa Salam: During 1911-1912, Thanwi wrote this book on Prophetic biography Sallalahu 'alaihi Wa Salam. He has professed obeisance to the Prophet Sallalahu 'alaihi Wa Salam in the 41 chapters of this book. He has presented him as a boon for the entire universe.

Influence and legacy 
He produced near about 1000 trainees, to whom he permitted for Bay'ah and those spread their influences of Thanwi. Among them are: Sulaiman Nadvi, Shabbir Ahmad Usmani, Zafar Ahmad Usmani, Abdul Hai Arifi, Athar Ali Bengali, Shah Abd al-Wahhab, Abdul Majid Daryabadi, Aziz al-Hasan Ghouri, Abrarul Haq Haqqi, Muhammadullah Hafezzi, Khair Muhammad Jalandhari, Masihullah Khan, Muhammad Shafi Deobandi, Murtaza Hasan Chandpuri, Habibullah Qurayshi, Muhammad Tayyib Qasmi. His edicts and religious teachings have been deemed authoritative even by many of his opponents. Muhammad Iqbal once wrote to a friend of his that on the matter of Rumi's teachings, he held Thanwi as the greatest living authority.

See also 
 Bibliography of Ashraf Ali Thanwi

References

Notes

Citations

External links 

Ashraf Ali Thanwi
1863 births
1943 deaths
Indian Sunni Muslim scholars of Islam
Chishtis
Hanafis
Maturidis
Deobandis
Mujaddid
19th-century Muslim scholars of Islam
People from British India
People from Shamli district
Darul Uloom Deoband alumni
Leaders of the Pakistan Movement
Students of Mahmud Hasan Deobandi
Indian writers
Translators of the Quran into Urdu
Urdu-language writers
Indian Islamic religious leaders
Islam in India
Founders of Indian schools and colleges
Muslim reformers
Quranic exegesis scholars
Indian Sufis
Hadith scholars